Eupleurogrammus is a genus of cutlassfish from the Indo-Pacific region. They are benthopelagic fishes which occur mainly over the continental shelf where they move upwards in the water column towards the surface at night and feed on small fishes, squid and crustaceans. They have very elongated and highly compressed bodies which tapers towards a posterior point.

Species
There are two species in the genus Eupleorogrammus:

 Eupleurogrammus glossodon, (Bleeker, 1860) (Longtooth hairtail)
 Eupleurogrammus muticus, (Gray, 1831) (Smallhead hairtail)

References

Trichiuridae
Marine fish genera